Shakhnoza Yunusova (born 2 January 1999) is a Uzbekistani boxer. She competed in the women's welterweight event at the 2020 Summer Olympics.

References

External links
 

1999 births
Living people
Sportspeople from Tashkent
Uzbekistani women boxers
Olympic boxers of Uzbekistan
Boxers at the 2020 Summer Olympics
20th-century Uzbekistani women
21st-century Uzbekistani women